Brocchi is a surname, and may refer to:
Cristian Brocchi (born 1976), Italian football manager and former player
Giovanni Battista Brocchi (1772–1826), Italian naturalist, mineralogist and geologist
Paul Brocchi (1838–1898), French naturalist and agronomist

See also
Brocchi's Cluster

Italian-language surnames